The De Meester cabinet was the cabinet of the Netherlands from 17 August 1905 until 12 February 1908. The cabinet was formed by the political parties Liberal Union (LU) and the Free-thinking Democratic League (VDB) after the election of 1905. The right-wing cabinet was a minority government in the House of Representatives but was supported by Independent Liberals for a majority. Theo de Meester of the Liberal Union was Prime Minister.

Cabinet Members

 Resigned.
 Appointment: Jacob Kraus appointed Minister of Water Management.

References

External links
Official

  Kabinet-De Meester Parlement & Politiek

Cabinets of the Netherlands
1905 establishments in the Netherlands
1908 disestablishments in the Netherlands
Cabinets established in 1905
Cabinets disestablished in 1908
Minority governments